William Tyndall was a US Representative.

William Tyndall may also refer to:

William Tyndall (MP) for Bristol (UK Parliament constituency), 1558
William Tyndale, an alternate spelling